The International Ultralight Banchee (also called the Banshee) is an American ultralight aircraft designed by Brian Jensen, Gil Kinzie and Nick Nichols and produced by International Ultralight Aviation. The aircraft was supplied as a kit for amateur construction.

Design and development
It features a cable-braced high-wing, single-seat, open cockpit, single pusher engine configuration, and is equipped with tricycle landing gear.

The aircraft is made from bolted-together aluminum tubing, with the wing covered with Dacron sailcloth. Its  span wing is cable-braced from an inverted "V" kingpost, has 4° of dihedral and 15° of sweepback. The three-axis control system is unconventional, with pitch controlled by an all-flying canard, yaw by wingtip rudders and roll by spoilerons, all actuated by a single side-stick, the aircraft lacking rudder pedals. The cockpit is an open sling seat without a windshield. The tricycle landing gear features suspension on all wheels. The Cuyuna 430R engine is mounted behind the pilot and can produce  at 6250 rpm.

A ballistic parachute was available as an option, as was an electric starter; the company claimed that the Banchee could be rigged in 35 minutes.

Accidents and incidents
On 21 May 1983 during a demonstration flight at St. George, Utah a Banchee suffered a cable swaging failure at an altitude of  that resulted in one fatality. The US
National Transportation Safety Board cited the probable causes as improper maintenance and quality assurance on the part of the manufacturer. The company went out of business shortly after the accident.

Specifications (Banchee)

References

1980s United States ultralight aircraft
Homebuilt aircraft
Banchee
Canard aircraft
Single-engined pusher aircraft